Elections for the Scottish district councils were held in 1980.

These were the third elections held to the 53 district councils established by the Local Government (Scotland) Act 1973. The previous elections had been held in 1977. The elections took place a year after the Conservative government of Margaret Thatcher had come to power. The local elections, which also took place in England and Wales, were seen as the first electoral test of the Thatcher ministry.

Background
The poll was held on 1 May and all 1,182 district council seats were to be filled. Districts formed the second tier in local government in Scotland under the 1975 reorganisation, with regional councils forming the upper tier. It was intended that elections would normally take place on a four-year cycle. Regional elections were also to be on a four-year cycle, held midway between district elections.

Party performance
Labour had a very good electoral performance, more than regaining the ground they had lost at the 1977 elections. They gained 18 councils:  3 from the Scottish National Party, one from Liberals and 14 from no overall control. Notable gains were the cities of Aberdeen, Dundee and Glasgow. The Conservatives suffered the loss of Edinburgh but held another six councils. The SNP vote collapsed and they lost control of the three councils they controlled. In a number of councils all of the party's sitting councillors were defeated, most notably in Glasgow where they lost all 16 seats they held. The Liberal Party lost the only council they controlled.

|-
!colspan=2|Parties
!Votes
!Votes %
!Wards
|-
| 
|
|45.4
|469
|-
| 
|
|24.1
|232
|-
| 
|
|15.5
|52
|-
| 
|
|6.2
|33
|-
| style="width: 10px" bgcolor=|
| style="text-align: left;" scope="row" | Independent/Other
|
|8.9
|
|-
!colspan=2|Total!! !! !!
|}

Results by council area
The seats on each council before and after the election were as follows:

Borders

Central

Dumfries and Galloway

Fife

Grampian

Highland

‡ Changes in ward boundaries

Lothian

‡ Changes in ward boundaries

Strathclyde

Tayside

References

 
1980
Scottish local elections